Eliyathur is a village in Chinnasalem block, Kallakkurichi division, Kallakurichi district  of Tamil Nadu.

References

Villages in Kallakurichi district